The Korean Association of Retired Persons, also known as KARP, is an international, not-for-profit, non-governmental organization affiliated with the United Nations. It is dedicated to serving the interests and needs of Koreans ages 50+.

Since its inception in 1996 in New York City, KARP has been active in providing tangible services not only to its members, but also to the communities as a whole. As a result, KARP has realized a significant growth from its original 20 charter members to its current base of approximately 100,000. This continually expanding membership base represents an impressive position within the ageing society in Korea.

Organizational role
The primary objective of KARP is to assist and advocate Koreans and Korean-Americans in adapting their lifestyles as they age.

About founder
Myong Y. Juch, is the president of the KARP.

As an immigrant early in eighties, he and his wife opened a delicatessen in the upper West Side of Manhattan and served his community.

He served two terms as President of Korean-American Grocer’s Association (KAGRO) which has membership of over 3,500 store owners in the New York metropolitan area.

In 1994, Myong Juch was elected as the 23rd President of the Korean-American Association of Greater New York (KAANY), to represent 450,000 Korean-Americans.

After serving his term, Myong became a McDonald's Owner/Operator in New York City.
He was the first Korean to own and operate McDonald’s in the United States.

Myong Juch returned to Korea in late 2001, to serve as the President of KARP.

KARP activities
KARP continues to develop and implement programs. These programs, both currently ongoing or being planned for the near future, include the following;
 KARP’s Monthly Magazine
 Annual Award Banquet
 Membership Service Programs
 Domestic NGO Coalition
 UN & International NGO Coalition
 Cultural Exchanges
 Conventions
 Walk Korea; Walkthon
 Motor Korea
 WHO, The Global Embrace
 456 Festival
 KARP Street Fair
 Seminars/Workshops

External links
 KARP official website (in Korean)
 KARP - UN Department of Public Information

Korean diaspora in North America
Diaspora organizations in the United States
Overseas Korean groups